Nalani Kanakaʻole (born March 19, 1946) is a Hawaiian kumu hula at Hālau o Kekuhi. The daughter of Edith Kanakaʻole, she leads Hālau o Kekuhi along with her niece Huihui Kanahele-Mossman. In 1993, the sisters were jointly named National Heritage Fellows by the National Endowment for the Arts, which recognized them as "Hula Masters".

Early life and education 
Kanakaʻole was raised on homestead lands in Keaukaha, Hilo, Hawaii, in a traditional Hawaiian fashion. She first learned hula from her grandmother, Mary Kekuewa Kanaele Fujii. She was 13 years old when her mother Edith Kanakaʻole started work as a hula teacher, and began teaching hula herself at the age of 14 in 1960. Her family spoke the Hawaiian language at home.

Career 
In 1985, Kanakaʻole opened Sig Zane Designs alongside her husband Sig Zane.

Personal life 
In 1982, Kanakaʻole and Sig Zane had a son, Kūhaʻo Zane.

References 

1946 births
Hula dancers
Dance teachers
National Heritage Fellowship winners
Living people